Afroturbonilla hattenbergeriana is a species of sea snail, a marine gastropod mollusk in the family Pyramidellidae, the pyrams and their allies. This species is one of three other species within the Afroturbonilla genus, with the exception of the others being Afroturbonilla engli and Afroturbonilla multitudinalis.

Distribution
This species occurs within the Atlantic Ocean off the west coast of Angola.

References

External links
 To Encyclopedia of Life
 To World Register of Marine Species

Endemic fauna of Angola
Pyramidellidae
Gastropods described in 1999